The 25th Critics' Choice Awards were presented on January 12, 2020, at the Barker Hangar at the Santa Monica Airport, honoring the finest achievements of filmmaking and television programming in 2019. The ceremony was broadcast on The CW and Taye Diggs returned to host for the second consecutive time. The nominations were announced on December 8, 2019. HBO led with 33 nominations, followed by Netflix with 31.

Winners and nominees

Film

#SeeHer Award
 Kristen Bell

Lifetime Achievement Award
 Eddie Murphy

Television

Films with multiple nominations and wins

The following twenty-seven films received multiple nominations:

The following six films received multiple awards:

Television programs with multiple nominations and wins

The following programs received multiple nominations:

The following programs received multiple awards:

References

External links
 25th Annual Critics Choice Awards – Winners

Broadcast Film Critics Association Awards
2019 film awards
2020 in Los Angeles County, California
January 2020 events in the United States